Fredrik Fortkord (born 12 October 1979) is a Swedish freestyle skier. He competed at the 2002 Winter Olympics and the 2006 Winter Olympics.

References

External links
 

1979 births
Living people
Swedish male freestyle skiers
Olympic freestyle skiers of Sweden
Freestyle skiers at the 2002 Winter Olympics
Freestyle skiers at the 2006 Winter Olympics
People from Nacka Municipality
Sportspeople from Stockholm County
21st-century Swedish people